Haijian 110 is a China Marine Surveillance (CMS) ship in the 1st Marine Surveillance Flotilla of the North China Sea Fleet. She was commissioned on November 12, 2012. Haijian 110 was formerly a tug boat Beituo 710 in the North China Sea Fleet of PLA Navy. She was decommissioned from the China's armed forces, retrofitted for maritime law enforcement purposes, and recommissioned to CMS. She was renamed China Coast Guard 1310 in 2013.

References

Ships of the China Marine Surveillance